Keith William McGill II (born March 9, 1989) is a former American football safety. He was drafted by the Oakland Raiders in the fourth round of the 2014 NFL Draft. He played college football at Utah.

Early years
McGill attended La Mirada High School in La Mirada, California, where he earned letters in football, track and basketball.

High school career
McGill played in 10 games his senior year (06-07) racking up 20 Total Tackles and 1 Interception on defense on top of his 516 yards rushing and 297 yards receiving with 7 touchdowns.

College career
He played his freshman season at Cerritos College in 2009 as a free safety. He posted 30 tackles and five interceptions. In 2010, he led the team with seven interceptions and posted 37 tackles, earning himself Northern Conference Defensive Player of the Year, and was named to the first-team All-American by CCCFA following his sophomore season.

He committed to Utah, after being named one of the best junior college prospects of his class by Rivals.com.

In 2011, his first season with the Utes, he played in five games as a safety before suffering an injury during the Arizona State game that forced him to miss the rest of the season. He missed the entire 2012 NCAA season due to lengthy, ongoing rehab of his shoulder surgery. As a senior, he started all 12 games at cornerback, amassing 37 total tackles, with 12 pass break ups and an interception returned for a touchdown, and was named an honorable mention All-Pac-12 selection.

Professional career

McGill was drafted by the Oakland Raiders in the fourth round, 116th overall, of the 2014 NFL Draft.

On December 27, 2014, McGill scored his first career touchdown against the Denver Broncos on an 18-yard fumble return.

References

External links
Oakland Raiders bio
Utah Utes bio

1989 births
Living people
American football cornerbacks
Cerritos Falcons football players
Oakland Raiders players
People from La Mirada, California
Players of American football from California
Sportspeople from Los Angeles County, California
Utah Utes football players